Chithra (21 May 1965 – 21 August 2021) was an Indian actress best known for her work in Malayalam cinema. She had acted in more than 100 films. She acted along with  Prem Nazir and Mohanlal in her first film Attakalasham in 1983. She was nicknamed "Nallennai Chithra" because of the fame she attained with the advertisement of an oil company she had acted in.

Personal life and death 

She was born as second child among three children to Madhavan and Devi at Kochi in 1965. She has an elder sister Deepa and a younger sister, Divya. She studied at ICF Higher secondary school, Chennai. She studied until tenth grade and could not continue her studies since she became busy with movies by then.

She was married to Vijayaraghavan since 1990. They have a daughter, Mahalakshmi born in 1992. She retired from films after her marriage. She resided at Saligramam, Chennai with her family. She acted in Tamil serials.  She died on 21 August 2021 in Chennai due to a sudden cardiac arrest.

Partial filmography

Malayalam films

Tamil films

Telugu films

Kannada films

Hindi films

Television
Manasi (Doordarshan Malayalam)
Kaialavu Manasu (Sun TV) as Kanchana
Asaigal
Udhyogasthan
Saariyum Illai Thappum Illai - Micro Thodar Macro Sinthanaigal
Nagamma (Telugu) as Indrani
Kanavarukaaga (Sun TV) as Arundhati
Malargal (Sun TV) as Indira

References

External links

Chitra at MSI

Actresses in Malayalam cinema
Indian film actresses
Actresses in Tamil cinema
Actresses in Kannada cinema
Actresses in Telugu cinema
Actresses from Kochi
Actresses in Malayalam television
Actresses in Tamil television
Actresses in Telugu television
Indian television actresses
20th-century Indian actresses
21st-century Indian actresses
Actresses in Hindi cinema
1965 births
2021 deaths